The 2015 Saint Louis FC season was the franchise's first season in the United Soccer League, the third division of soccer in the United States.

The club was affiliated with the Chicago Fire of Major League Soccer that season.

Squad
Where a player has not declared an international allegiance, nation is determined by place of birth.

Player movement

New Signings

Loans

In

Out

United Soccer League season

Preseason

Results summary

Matches

Tables

Eastern Conference Table

U.S. Open Cup

Matches

Player statistics

Goals

Assists

Shutouts

Kit
Supplier: Nike / Sponsor: Electrical Connection, NECA/IBEW Local 1

References

Saint Louis FC seasons
Saint Louis FC
Saint Louis
Saint Louis FC